"Loving You More" is a song by American electronica artist BT, featuring vocals by Vincent Covello. It was released on September 4, 1995 through Perfecto and East West Records as the fourth single from his debut studio album, Ima. On release, the song reached number 14 on the UK Singles Chart, as well as number 2 and number 18 on the UK and the US Dance Chart respectively.

Background
On the original release of Ima, the song was included in two remix forms as part of "Sasha's Voyage of Ima": "BT's Garden of Ima Dub" and "BT's Final Spiritual Journey". However, the radio edit was included on the vinyl release, and the two remixes were included on the 1996 2CD re-release of the album.

A music video was created for the radio edit of the song, and released alongside the single. It has since resurfaced on YouTube.

Formats and track listings

Charts

References

1995 singles
1995 songs
BT (musician) songs